Marc Louis Benjamin Vautier (27 April 1829 – 25 April 1898) was a Swiss genre painter and illustrator.

Life and work 

He was born in Morges. He was the son of a teacher and began his art studies in Geneva, then worked for two years as a jewelry enamel painter. In 1849, he obtained a position in the studios of history painter Jean-Léonard Lugardon. While there, he also took courses in anatomical drawing at a nearby art school.

The following year, he began attending the Kunstakademie Düsseldorf and became a member of "Malkasten" (Paintbox), a local artists' association. He left the Academy for one year to work with Rudolf Jordan as a private student. Eventually, he decided to devote himself to depicting peasant life, which he observed for several years by visiting the Bernese Oberland.

In 1856 he went to Paris, but returned to Düsseldorf a year later and painted his first peasant genre pictures. Initially, he focused on Switzerland, but finally decided to concentrate on the Black Forest region. He also worked as an illustrator (Der Oberhof by Karl Leberecht Immermann, Barfüßele by Berthold Auerbach, and others). Later, he became a Royal Professor at the Academy in Düsseldorf.

He died in 1898 in Düsseldorf.

References

External links

Illustrations online (selection) 
Digitalized by the University and State Library Düsseldorf: 
 In: Album deutscher Kunst und Dichtung. Mit Holzschnitten nach Originalzeichnungen der Künstler, ausgeführt von R. Brend'amour. Friedrich Bodenstedt. - Berlin : Grote, 1867.  
 In: Aquarelle Düsseldorfer Künstler : den kunstsinnigen Damen gewidmet. - Düsseldorf : Arnz, 1861. English Edition: Aquarels of Düsseldorf artists. - Düsseldorf: Arnz, 1852.  
 Auerbach, Berthold. Barfüßele. - Stuttgart : Cotta, 1870.  
 In: Düsseldorfer Bilder-Mappe : Original-Zeichnungen. - Berlin : Grote, 1866.  
 In: Howitt, Mary Botham. The Dusseldorf artist's album. - Dusseldorf : Arnz, 1854.  
 Kurzweil und Zeitvertreib : Bilder aus dem Leben in 12 Bleistiftzeichnungen. - München : Ackermann, 1884.  
 In: Märchen und Sagen für Jung und Alt. - Düsseldorf : Arnz : Voß, 1857, Vol.2  
 Immermann, Karl. Der Oberhof : aus Immermann's Münchhausen. - Berlin : Hofmann, 1863.  
 In: Stieler, K./Wachenhusen, H. /Hackländer, F. W.: Rheinfahrt : Von den Quellen des Rheins bis zum Meere. - Stuttgart : Kröner, 1875.  
 In: Diethoff, E. Vom Rhein. Bilder und Geschichten aus alter und neuer Zeit. - Leipzig : Payne, 1871. 
 Gedichte. Arnz, Düsseldorf 1852 

1829 births
1898 deaths
Genre painters
19th-century Swiss painters
Swiss male painters
19th-century Swiss male artists